The 2021–22 Davidson Wildcats men's basketball team represented Davidson College during the 2021–22 NCAA Division I men's basketball season. The Wildcats were led by 33rd-year head coach Bob McKillop and played their home games at the John M. Belk Arena in Davidson, North Carolina as members of the Atlantic 10 Conference. They finished the season 27–7, 15–3 in A-10 Play to finish as regular season champions. They defeated Fordham and Saint Louis to advance to the championship game of the A–10 Tournament where they lost to Richmond. They received an at-large bid to the NCAA tournament as the No. 10 seed in the West Region, where they lost in the first round to Michigan State.

Previous season
In a season limited due to the ongoing COVID-19 pandemic, the Wildcats finished the 2020–21 season 13–9, 7–4 in A-10 play to finish in third place. They defeated George Mason in the quarterfinals of the A-10 tournament before losing in the semifinals to VCU. The Wildcats received an invitation to the National Invitation Tournament where they lost in the first round to NC State.

Offseason

Departures

Incoming transfers

Recruiting classes

2021 recruiting class

Source

2022 recruiting class

Roster

Schedule and results

|-
!colspan=12 style=| Exhibition

|-
!colspan=12 style=| Non-conference regular season

|-
!colspan=12 style=| A-10 regular season

|-
!colspan=12 style=| A-10 tournament

|-
!colspan=12 style=| NCAA tournament

Source

Rankings

*AP does not release post-NCAA Tournament rankings.^Coaches do not release a Week 1 poll.

References

Davidson
Davidson Wildcats men's basketball seasons
Davidson Wildcats men's basketball
Davidson Wildcats men's basketball
Davidson